A large number of bombings have taken place in Baghdad, especially since the beginning of the War in Iraq. Wikipedia has individual articles on the following attacks:

1950s
1950–51 Baghdad bombings

2003
 2003 Jordanian embassy bombing in Baghdad
 Canal Hotel bombing
 27 October 2003 Baghdad bombings

2004
 2004 Ashura bombings in Iraq
 June 2004 Baghdad bombing
 14 September 2004 Baghdad bombing
 30 September 2004 Baghdad bombing

2005
 17 August 2005 Baghdad bombings
 14 September 2005 Baghdad bombings

2006
 Buratha Mosque bombing
 1 July 2006 Sadr City bombing
 23 November 2006 Sadr City bombings

2007
 Mustansiriya University bombings
 22 January 2007 Baghdad bombings
 3 February 2007 Baghdad market bombing
 12 February 2007 Baghdad bombings
 18 February 2007 Baghdad bombings
 29 March 2007 Baghdad bombings
 2007 Iraqi Parliament bombing
 18 April 2007 Baghdad bombings
 19 June 2007 al-Khilani Mosque bombing
 26 July 2007 Baghdad market bombing
 1 August 2007 Baghdad bombings

2008
 1 February 2008 Baghdad bombings
 6 March 2008 Baghdad bombing
 17 June 2008 Baghdad bombing
 28 September 2008 Baghdad bombings

2009
 8 March 2009 Baghdad police recruitment centre bombing
 6 April 2009 Baghdad bombings
 23 April 2009 Iraqi suicide attacks
 24 June 2009 Baghdad bombing
 19 August 2009 Baghdad bombings
 25 October 2009 Baghdad bombings
 8 December 2009 Baghdad bombings

2010
 25 January 2010 Baghdad bombings
 1 February 2010 Baghdad bombing
 4 April 2010 Baghdad bombings
 6 April 2010 Baghdad bombings
 April 2010 Baghdad bombings
 10 May 2010 Iraq attacks
 20 June 2010 Baghdad bombings
 July 2010 Baghdad bombing
 17 August 2010 Baghdad bombings
 19 September 2010 Baghdad attacks
 2010 Baghdad church massacre
 2 November 2010 Baghdad bombings

2011
 24 January 2011 Iraq bombings
 27 January 2011 Baghdad bombing
 28 August 2011 Baghdad bombing
 October 2011 Baghdad bombings
 22 December 2011 Baghdad bombings

2012
 5 January 2012 Iraq bombings
 27 January 2012 Baghdad bombing
 23 February 2012 Iraq attacks
 13 June 2012 Iraq attacks
 9 September 2012 Iraq attacks

2013
 19 March 2013 Iraq attacks
 18 April 2013 Baghdad bombing
 27 May 2013 Baghdad bombings
 21 September 2013 Iraq attacks
 2013 Iraq Christmas Day bombings

2015
 February 2015 Baghdad bombings
 2015 Baghdad market truck bombing

2016
 January 2016 Iraq attacks
 February 2016 Baghdad bombings
 April 2016 Baghdad bombing
 11 May 2016 Baghdad bombings
 17 May 2016 Baghdad bombings
 2016 Karrada bombing
 9 September 2016 Baghdad bombings
 October 2016 Baghdad attacks
 December 2016 Baghdad bombings

2017
 January 2017 Baghdad bombings
 Al-Faqma ice cream parlor bombing

2018
 January 2018 Baghdad bombings

2019
Attack on the United States embassy in Baghdad

2020
2020 Camp Taji attacks

2021
January 2021 Baghdad bombings